James Michael Gardner Fell (4 December 1923, Vancouver – 16 December 2016, Gladwyne, Pennsylvania) was a Canadian-American mathematician, specializing in functional analysis and representation theory. He is known for Fell bundles (i.e. Banach *-algebraic bundles). He was an accomplished linguist who knew Sanskrit, Icelandic, German, French, Russian, Greek, and Latin.

Biography
J. M. G. Fell's father was James Pemberton Fell, a colonel in the Canadian Army Corps of Engineers and a real estate developer who helped to  lay out the streets of North Vancouver. J. M. G. Fell attended elementary school in Vancouver and then in 1935 went to England for secondary school at Eton. In 1940 he returned to Canada and matriculated at the University of British Columbia, graduating there in 1943 at the age of 19. In 1951 he received his Ph.D. in mathematics from the University of California, Berkeley under John L. Kelley with thesis On L-spaces.

He was an assistant professor at California Institute of Technology from 1953 to 1955, a research associate at the University of Chicago from 1955 to 1956, and an assistant professor, then associate professor, and then full professor at the University of Washington from 1956 to 1965. He was a full professor from 1965 to 1991 at the University of Pennsylvania, where he retired as professor emeritus.

On 4 July 1957 Fell married Angela Daphne Rachel MacDonald.

He was an Invited Speaker at the ICM in 1970 in Nice. He gave a mathematical lecture at the University of Iceland, and in 2000 the University gave him an honorary doctorate in theology.

Upon his death he was survived by his wife, two children, and a grandson.

Fell bundles

Selected publications

References

1923 births
2016 deaths
20th-century Canadian mathematicians
20th-century American mathematicians
University of British Columbia alumni
University of California, Berkeley alumni
University of Washington faculty
University of Pennsylvania faculty
Canadian emigrants to the United States